This is a list of flag bearers who have represented Niger at the Olympics.

Flag bearers carry the national flag of their country at the opening ceremony of the Olympic Games.

See also
Niger at the Olympics

References

Niger at the Olympics
Niger
Olympic flagbearers